Mabalane is a village in Kgatleng District of Botswana.

Location
It is located 55 km east of Gaborone, close to the border with South Africa.

Education
It has a primary school.

Population
The population was 814 in 2001 census.

References

Kgatleng District
Villages in Botswana